Horst Schütz (born 8 May 1951 in Kandel) is a retired German cyclist who won the UCI Motor-paced World Championships in 1984.

Background
Schütz was a versatile cyclist. In 1975 he won two national titles among amateurs in madison and in team time trial. In 1976 he turned professional and won a national title in the sprint. During his career he took part in 126 six-day races and won three: in 1980 in Zurich, in 1981 in Hanover, and in 1984 in Berlin. Apart from the world title in motor-paced racing in 1984, he finished second nationally in this discipline in 1984 and 1985, and then retired from cycling.

References

1951 births
Living people
People from Germersheim (district)
Cyclists from Rhineland-Palatinate
German male cyclists
UCI Track Cycling World Champions (men)
German track cyclists